The 1984–85 Ohio State Buckeyes men's basketball team represented Ohio State University during the 1984–85 NCAA Division I men's basketball season. Led by ninth-year head coach Eldon Miller, the Buckeyes finished 20–10 (11–7 Big Ten) and reached the second round of the NCAA tournament.

Roster

Schedule/results

|-
!colspan=9 style=| Non-Conference Regular Season

|-
!colspan=9 style=| Big Ten Regular Season

|-
!colspan=9 style=|NCAA Tournament

Rankings

References

Ohio State Buckeyes men's basketball seasons
Ohio State
Ohio State